This is a list of biggest airlines of Russia, by number of passengers and by the amount of cargo transported.

Passengers Transferred

2016 Statistics 
Source: FAVT

2014 Statistics

2013 Statistics

2012 statistics 

 Notes
 Excluding the Aeroflot-Group Airlines Rossyia, Donavia, Aurora, Orenair и Pobeda
 Excluding UTair-Group Airlines UTair Express and other airlines
 Excluding an S7-Group Airline Globus
 The airlines mentioned with cursive letters, are the airlines, which ceased their operations currently

By Cargo Transportation

2014 Statistics

2013 Statistics

By the fleet capacity and destinations 
The Russia's biggest airlines by the number of the fleet and destinations:

 Notes
 Including all the Aeroflot-Group airlines: Rossiya, Donavia, Aurora, Orenair и Pobeda
 Including Azur Air, UTair-Express, UTair-Ukraine(to be renamed to Azur Air-Ukraine) and UTair Helicopters
 Including Globus

See also 
 List of defunct airlines of Russia
 List of airlines of Russia
 World's largest airlines

References 

Russia